Events in the year 1827 in Japan.

Incumbents 
Monarch: Ninkō

Births
January 27 - Nakahama Manjirō (d. 1898), translator

References

 
1820s in Japan
Japan
Years of the 19th century in Japan